This table displays the top-rated primetime television series of the 2010–11 season as measured by Nielsen Media Research.

References

2010 in American television
2011 in American television
2010-related lists
2011-related lists
Lists of American television series